The NWT Spruce Coupe is an American homebuilt aircraft that was designed and produced by NWT Co of Charleston, Maine. When it was available the aircraft was supplied as a kit and also in the form of plans for amateur construction.

Design and development
The Spruce Coupe features a strut-braced low-wing, a single-seat enclosed cockpit, fixed conventional landing gear and a single engine in tractor configuration.

The aircraft is made from a combination of spruce or pine, and fir, birch, mahogany plywood with its flying surfaces covered in doped aircraft fabric.

The manufacturer estimates the construction time from the supplied kit as 500 hours.

Operational history
By 1998 the company reported that one aircraft had been completed and was flying.

Specifications (Spruce Coupe)

References

External links
Photo of a Spruce Coupe

Spruce Coupe
1990s United States sport aircraft
1990s United States ultralight aircraft
1990s United States civil utility aircraft
Single-engined tractor aircraft
Low-wing aircraft
Homebuilt aircraft